Yenisei (Russian: Енисей), project name RN STK-1 (Raketa-Nositel' SverkhTyazhologo Klassa - Carrier rocket super-heavy class), was the first super-heavy launch vehicle being developed by the Russian space industry since the fall of the USSR. The main developer is RSC Energia.

It is being developed within the framework of the federal target program "Creation of a super-heavy class space rocket complex for 2020-2030" and the program cost is estimated at 1.5 trillion roubles (US$1.6 billion). It is the main rocket of the Russian Lunar program.

The final design for the rocket was expected to be complete by autumn 2021, but the program appears to have been paused or stopped just before this expected completion date.

The first launch is expected to happen in 2028 from the Vostochny cosmodrome.

Based on the Yenisei launch vehicle, the Don launch vehicle (RN STK-2) is being developed by adding another stage.

It looks like this proposal has been at least paused.

Development 
The rocket got its name at the end of 2018, before that it was called "RN STK" (super-heavy launch vehicle).

Chronology of development.

Planned events 
 October 2021 - end of technical design.
 2026-2028 - construction and commissioning of infrastructure for a super-heavy launch vehicle and a medium-class rocket for launching crewed spacecraft from the Vostochny cosmodrome.

Design 
The first stage will consist of 6 blocks, each block will be based on the first stage of the planned Irtysh / Soyuz-5 rocket with an RD-171MV engine.

The second stage will consist of one block - matching the first stage of Soyuz-6 - with RD-180 as engine.

The upper stage will be KVTK

Accelerating braking unit: Block DM

Proposed variants

Flight tests 

Flight tests of a super-heavy launch vehicle will take place in two stages from 2028 to 2035.

The first stage of testing will take place in 2028–2032. It involves the launch of a crewed spacecraft, a lunar take-off and landing complex (LVPK) and other payloads on the trajectory of the flight around the Moon and circumlunar orbits in order to work out the elements of a crewed complex, create a station in the orbit of the Moon, and land on the lunar surface.

The second stage of testing will take place in 2032–2035. It is planned to launch LVPK and other uncrewed payloads for the construction and operation of a base on the lunar surface. In addition, this stage involves participation in international programs related to the study of Mars.

Applications 
The super-heavy rocket is supposed to be used in the Russian lunar program, since the carrying capacity of the Angara-A5V launch vehicle (37.5 tons to LEO) is insufficient for these purposes.

Lunar program payloads 

 20-ton Orel spacecraft.
 27-ton lunar landing and takeoff complex (LPVK).
 32-ton lunar base module.

Satellite constellation 

 Spacecraft up to 30 tons to geostationary orbit
 Space telescopes 30-40 tons to the L2 Lagrange point in the Sun-Earth system

See also 

 Space Launch System
 Falcon Heavy
 Starship
 Long March 9

References 

Space launch vehicles of Russia
Expendable space launch systems